Philip Upchurch (born July 19, 1941) is an American jazz and blues guitarist and bassist.

Career
Upchurch started his career working with the Kool Gents, the Dells, and the Spaniels, before going on to work with Curtis Mayfield, Otis Rush, and Jimmy Reed. (His association with Kool Gents member Dee Clark would continue, including playing guitar on Clark's 1961 solo hit "Raindrops".) He then returned to Chicago to play and record with Woody Herman, Stan Getz, Groove Holmes, B.B. King, and Dizzy Gillespie.

In 1961, his record "You Can't Sit Down" by the Philip Upchurch Combo, sold over one million copies and was awarded a gold disc. "You Can't Sit Down, Part 2" peaked at No. 29 on the Billboard charts in the US. And he released his first album. In the 1960s he toured with Oscar Brown, appearing on the 1965 live album, Mr. Oscar Brown, Jr. Goes to Washington. In the mid-1960s he was house guitarist of Chess Records and he played with The Dells, Howlin' Wolf, Muddy Waters and Gene Chandler. He also played with John Lee Hooker, Grover Washington, Jr. and Cannonball Adderley. Upchurch was part of a group called The Soulful Strings during the 1960s, prior to working with the Rotary Connection on Chess's Cadet label.

In the 1970s, he worked with Donny Hathaway, Harvey Mason, Ramsey Lewis, Quincy Jones and led his own quartet with Tennyson Stephens. He met Bob Krasnow and Tommy LiPuma, the founders of Blue Thumb Records, and he released Darkness Darkness. Upchurch played on Donny Hathaway's "This Christmas" and "The Ghetto". He also played guitar on Hathaway's Live album (1972). In the mid 1970s and 1980s, he performed with George Benson, Mose Allison, Gary Burton, Lenny Breau, Joe Williams, Chaka Khan, Natalie Cole, Carmen McRae, Cat Stevens, David Sanborn, and Michael Jackson. In the 1990s he worked with Jimmy Smith and Jack McDuff.

Discography

As leader
 You Can't Sit Down, Part Two (Boyd/United Artists #UAL-3162 mono and #UAS-6162 stereo, 1961)
 The Big Hit Dances: The Twist... (United Artists #UAL-3175 mono and #UAS-6175 stereo, 1962)
 Feeling Blue: The Phil Upchurch Guitar Sound (Milestone #9010; OJC #1100, 1967)
 Upchurch (Cadet/Chess #LPS-826, 1969) with Donny Hathaway on piano.
 The Way I Feel (Cadet/Chess/GRT #LPS-840, 1970)
 Darkness Darkness (Blue Thumb #BTS-6005, 1972)
 Lovin' Feeling (Blue Thumb #BTS-59, 1973)
 Upchurch/Tennyson with Tennyson Stephens (Kudu/CTI #KU-22, 1975)
 Phil Upchurch (Marlin/TK Records #MAR-2209, 1978) produced by John Tropea and George Benson.
 Free & Easy (JAM [Jazz America Marketing] #007, 1981)
 Revelation (JAM #011, 1982)
 Name of the Game (JAM #018, 1983)
 Companions (JAM #021, 1984) issued as Paladin/Virgin #PAL-4 for UK market.
 Phil Upchurch Presents L.A. Jazz Quintet (Pro Arte/Intersound #631, 1986) with Brandon Fields, Bobby Lyle, Brian Bromberg, Harvey Mason.
 Dolphin Dance (Sound Service #6177, 1987)
 Midnite Blue (Electric Bird/King [Japan] #KICJ-53, 1991) compilation of JAM material.
 All I Want (Ichiban #ICH-1127, 1991)
 Whatever Happened To The Blues (Ridgetop/Bean Bag/Go Jazz #55566; Go Jazz #6006, 1991) issued as Go Jazz #VBR-2066 for Germany market.
 Love Is Strange (Ridgetop/Bean Bag/Go Jazz #55552; Go Jazz #6014, 1995)
 Rhapsody & Blues (Go Jazz #6035, 1999)
 Tell the Truth! (Evidence #22222, 2001) produced by Carla Olson.
 Impressions Of Curtis Mayfield by Jazz Soul Seven (BFM Jazz/Varese Sarabande #62413, 2012) produced by Brian Brinkerhoff; co-produced and arranged by Phil Upchurch; featuring Terri Lyne Carrington, Russ Ferrante, Master Henry Gibson, Bob Hurst, Wallace Roney, Phil Upchurch, Ernie Watts. ["The album I'm most proud of", Phil Upchurch 2012].

With the Soulful Strings
 Paint It Black (Cadet/Chess #LPS-776, 1966)
 Groovin' with the Soulful Strings (Cadet/Chess #LPS-796, 1967)
 Another Exposure (Cadet/Chess #LPS-805, 1968)
 The Magic of Christmas (Cadet/Chess #LPS-814, 1968)
 Back by Demand: The Soulful Strings in Concert (Cadet/Chess #LPS-820, 1969)
 String Fever (Cadet/Chess #LPS-834, 1969)
 Play Gamble-Huff (Cadet/Chess/GRT #LPS-846, 1971)
 The Best of the Soulful Strings (Cadet/Chess/GRT #2CA-50022, 1972) compilation/2-LP set

As sideman
With Mose Allison
 Middle Class White Boy (Elektra Musician, 1982)

With Anita Baker
 Christmas Fantasy (Blue Note, 2005)

With George Benson
 Bad Benson (CTI, 1974)
 Good King Bad (CTI, 1975)
 Breezin' (Warner Bros., 1976)
 In Flight (Warner Bros., 1977)
 Livin' Inside Your Love (Warner Bros., 1979)

With Oscar Brown Jr.
 Mr. Oscar Brown Jr. Goes to Washington (Fontana, 1965)

With Peabo Bryson and Natalie Cole
 We're the Best of Friends (Capitol, 1979)

With Dee Clark
 Raindrops (Vee Jay, 1961)
 With Natalie Cole Unpredictable (Capitol, 1977)
 I Love You So (Capitol, 1979)
 Holly & Ivy (Elektra, 1994)With Bob Dylan Christmas in the Heart (Columbia, 2009)With Sheena Easton No Strings (MCA, 1993)With Stan Getz What the World Needs Now: Stan Getz Plays Burt Bacharach and Hal David (Verve, 1968)With Dizzy Gillespie The Real Thing (Perception, 1969)With Donny Hathaway Everything Is Everything (Atco, 1970)
 Donny Hathaway (Atco, 1971)
 Live (Atco, 1972)
 Extension of a Man (Atco, 1973)With Red Holloway Standing Room Only (Chiaroscuro, 2000)With Howlin' Wolf The Howlin' Wolf Album (Cadet Concept, 1969)
 The London Howlin' Wolf Sessions (Chess, 1971) with Eric Clapton, Bill Wyman, Charlie Watts, Steve Winwood, Ringo Starr, and others...With Michael Jackson Off the Wall (Epic, 1979)With Chaka Khan Chaka (Warner Bros., 1978)
 Naughty (Warner Bros., 1980)With Hubert Laws The Chicago Theme (CTI, 1974)With Ramsey Lewis Them Changes (Cadet/GRT, 1970)With Jack McDuff The Natural Thing (Cadet, 1968)
 The Heatin' System (Cadet/GRT, 1971)
 Magnetic Feel (Cadet/GRT, 1975)
 Kisses (Sugar Hill, 1981)With Carmen McRae Fine and Mellow: Live at Birdland West (Concord, 1987)With Jimmy Reed Soulin' (BluesWay, 1967)
 Big Boss Man (BluesWay, 1968)
 Down in Virginia (BluesWay, 1969)With Minnie Riperton Come to My Garden (GRT, 1970; Janus, 1974)
 Minnie (Capitol, 1979)With Rotary Connection Rotary Connection (Cadet Concept, 1968)With Ben Sidran Don't Let Go (Blue Thumb, 1974)With Jimmy Smith Stay Loose (Verve, 1968)
 Prime Time (Milestone, 1989)
 Sum Serious Blues (Milestone, 1993)
 Dot Com Blues (Blue Thumb, 2000)
 Black Cat (Castle Pie, 2001)With Muddy Waters' Electric Mud (Cadet Concept, 1968)
 After The Rain'' (Cadet Concept, 1969)

References

External links
 Phil Upchurch official site
Phil Upchurch Interview NAMM Oral History Library (2015)

1941 births
Living people
American rhythm and blues bass guitarists
American male bass guitarists
American rhythm and blues guitarists
American jazz bass guitarists
American jazz guitarists
Jazz-blues guitarists
American session musicians
Milestone Records artists
Guitarists from Chicago
20th-century American bass guitarists
Jazz musicians from Illinois
20th-century American male musicians
American male jazz musicians
Blue Thumb Records artists
CTI Records artists